Hwang Ye-Sul (Korean: 황예슬 ; born 2 November 1987 in Gyeonggi) is South Korean judoka. She competed in the 70 kg event in Judo at the 2012 Summer Olympics where she reached the semifinals but lost to Lucie Décosse and lost the bronze medal match to Edith Bosch.

References

External links
 
 

1987 births
Living people
Judoka at the 2012 Summer Olympics
Olympic judoka of South Korea
Asian Games medalists in judo
Judoka at the 2010 Asian Games
South Korean female judoka
Asian Games gold medalists for South Korea
Medalists at the 2010 Asian Games
Universiade medalists in judo
Universiade gold medalists for South Korea
Medalists at the 2013 Summer Universiade
Sportspeople from Gyeonggi Province
21st-century South Korean women